Exerodonta perkinsi is a species of frog in the family Hylidae otherwise known as the Perkins' tree frog.
It is endemic to Guatemala.
Its natural habitats are subtropical or tropical moist montane forests, rivers, intermittent freshwater marshes, and heavily degraded former forest.
It is threatened by habitat loss.

References

Sources

Exerodonta
Endemic fauna of Guatemala
Amphibians of Guatemala
Amphibians described in 1992
Taxonomy articles created by Polbot